Jack Perry (born June 16, 1997) is an American professional wrestler better known by the ring name "Jungle Boy" Jack Perry. He is currently signed to All Elite Wrestling (AEW), where he is a former one-time AEW World Tag Team Champion (with Luchasaurus as Jurassic Express).

Early life
Jack Perry was born on June 16, 1997, in Los Angeles, California. He is the son of actor Luke Perry and Rachel Sharp. Perry's maternal grandfather is the Scottish novelist and screenwriter Alan Sharp.

Perry grew up as a fan of professional wrestling and attended WWE's 2009 SummerSlam pay-per-view event with his father at the age of twelve.

Professional wrestling career

Early career (2015–2019)

Perry started his career on the independent circuit in 2015 making his professional wrestling debut at Underground Empire Wrestling's, 2015 West Coast Cruiser Cup  under the ring name "Nate Coy". This is where he was given the name Jungle Boy when the crowd chanted it at him because of his similarities to Tarzan. On November 20, 2016, Coy won the 2016 West Coast Cruiser Cup. On August 17, 2018, Coy won the All Pro Wrestling Junior Heavyweight Championship, his first professional wrestling championship. He later lost it to Jake Atlas at the Bay Area Bash event on June 15, 2019. In February 2019, Jungle Boy formed a tag team with fellow independent wrestler Luchasaurus, dubbed "A Boy and His Dinosaur". In May 2019, Perry wrestled in a tribute match for his late father, defeating his father's friend, actor and former WCW World Heavyweight Champion David Arquette.

All Elite Wrestling (2019–present)

Jurassic Express (2019–2022)

In January 2019, Perry signed with the upstart promotion All Elite Wrestling (AEW), under the Jungle Boy name. He made his AEW debut at the company's inaugural event Double or Nothing on May 25, competing in the pre-show Casino Battle Royale, but he was eliminated by Jimmy Havoc. The following month at Fyter Fest, Jungle Boy wrestled Jimmy Havoc, Adam Page and MJF in a four-way match, which Page won. At Fight for the Fallen on July 13, Jungle Boy teamed with Luchasaurus against Angélico and Jack Evans and The Dark Order (Evil Uno and Stu Grayson) in a three-way tag team match, but The Dark Order won. Soon after, Jungle Boy and Luchasaurus allied themselves with Marko Stunt, creating a new faction dubbed the "Jurassic Express". At All Out on August 31, the Jurassic Express was defeated by SoCal Uncensored (Christopher Daniels, Frankie Kazarian and Scorpio Sky) in a six-man tag team match. In October, Jungle Boy and Stunt competed in a tournament to determine the inaugural AEW World Tag Team Champions, but they were eliminated by the Lucha Brothers (Pentagón Jr. and Rey Fénix).

On the November 20 episode of Dynamite, Jungle Boy competed in the Dynamite Dozen Battle Royale, but failed to win. On the December 4 episode of Dynamite, Jungle Boy was challenged by AEW World Champion Chris Jericho to last 10 minutes in the ring with him, which he successfully did on the December 18 episode of Dynamite. On the January 15, 2020 episode of Dark, Jungle Boy obtained his first victory in AEW, after the Jurassic Express defeated Strong Hearts (Cima, El Lindaman and T-Hawk). On the February 19 episode of Dynamite, Jungle Boy and Luchasaurus competed in a tag team battle royal to determine the number one contenders for the AEW World Tag Team Championship, but the match was won by The Young Bucks (Matt Jackson and Nick Jackson). At Double or Nothing on May 23, Jungle Boy was defeated by MJF. On September 5 at All Out, Jungle Boy and Luchasaurus were defeated by The Young Bucks. At Winter Is Coming on December 2, Jungle Boy entered the Dynamite Dozen Battle Royale for the second year in a row, but was eliminated by MJF.

At the Revolution event on March 7, 2021, Jungle Boy and Luchasaurus competed in the Casino Tag Team Royale, but were unsuccessful in winning the match. At Double or Nothing in May, Jungle Boy won the Casino Battle Royale by lastly eliminating Christian Cage, entitling him to a match for the AEW World Championship, which he received against Kenny Omega on the June 26 episode of Dynamite, but lost. On the All Out pre-show on September 5, Jungle Boy and Luchasaurus teamed with Best Friends (Orange Cassidy, Chuck Taylor, and Wheeler Yuta) to defeat the Hardy Family Office (Matt Hardy, Private Party (Isiah Kassidy and Marq Quen), and The Hybrid 2 (Angélico and Jack Evans)) in a 10-man tag team match. Later in the show, Jungle Boy, Luchasaurus and Marko Stunt came to assist Christian Cage after Cage's main event match with Kenny Omega, but they were beaten down by Omega and his allies The Young Bucks, as well as the newly debuted Adam Cole. At Full Gear on November 13, Jungle Boy, Luchasaurus and Cage defeated The Young Bucks and Cole in a falls count anywhere match.

On the January 5, 2022 episode of Dynamite, Jungle Boy and Luchasaurus defeated the Lucha Brothers to win the AEW World Tag Team Championship. At the Revolution event on March 6, Jurassic Express successfully defended the championship against The Young Bucks and reDRagon (Bobby Fish and Kyle O'Reilly) in a three-way tag team match. At Double or Nothing on May 29, they retained the championship in a three-way tag match against Team Taz (Ricky Starks and Powerhouse Hobbs) and Swerve In Our Glory (Keith Lee and Swerve Strickland). However, at the Road Rager special event on June 15, Jurassic Express lost the tag team championship to The Young Bucks in a ladder match, ending their reign at 161 days. After the match, Jungle Boy was betrayed by his mentor Christian Cage, who attacked him following the loss.

Singles competition (2022–present)
Jungle Boy would initiate a rivalry with Christian Cage, and the two would face in a match at the All Out event in September. At the event, Jungle Boy would be defeated in 20 seconds, after Luchasaurus attacked him and allied himself with Cage. At the Full Gear event on November 19, Jungle Boy, now wrestling under his real name of Jack Perry, would defeat Luchasaurus in a steel cage match. Perry began a short feud with The Firm, where he teamed with Hook, to defeat members, Lee Moriarty, Ethan Page and Big Bill in various tag team matches. On the February 15 edition of Dynamite, Christian Cage, who had been out with an arm injury since All Out, returned attacking Jungle Boy, renewing their rivalry. At AEW Revolution 2023, Jungle Boy defeated Cage in a Final Burial match.

Professional wrestling persona
Perry's Jungle Boy character has been described as a "Tarzan-esque character, complete with his mane of long curls, loin cloth-like shorts and a heavy dose of leopard print." Perry originally thought the gimmick was "really dumb", but changed his mind after seeing "how people liked it". As a finisher, Jungle Boy uses a cross-legged STF named the Snare Trap. Jungle Boy uses the 1985 song "Tarzan Boy" by Baltimora as his entrance music.

Personal life
, Perry is in a relationship with fellow AEW wrestler Anna Jay.

Perry has a tattoo underneath his right shoulder saying "in this life and in all others".

Championships and accomplishments

All Elite Wrestling
 AEW World Tag Team Championship (1 time) – with Luchasaurus
 Men's Casino Battle Royale (2021)
All Pro Wrestling
 APW Junior Heavyweight Championship (1 time)
Revolution Eastern Wrestling
REW Pakistan 24/7 Championship (1 time)
DDT Pro-Wrestling
Ironman Heavymetalweight Championship (1 time)
Pro Wrestling Illustrated
Ranked No. 69 of the top 500 singles wrestlers in the PWI 500 in 2021
Pro Wrestling Revolution
PWR Tag Team Championships (1 time) - with El Prostipirugolfo
Underground Empire Wrestling
 West Coast Cruiser Cup (2016)
Wrestling Observer Newsletter
Rookie of the Year (2019)

References

External links

 
 

1997 births
All Elite Wrestling personnel
AEW World Tag Team Champions
American male professional wrestlers
American people of Scottish descent
Living people
Professional wrestlers from California
Sportspeople from Los Angeles
21st-century professional wrestlers
Ironman Heavymetalweight Champions